Durch Einander is the fifth studio album by German recording artist Max Mutzke. It was released by Columbia Records and Sony Music on 14 September 2012 in German-speaking Europe.

Track listing

Charts

Release history

References

External links
MaxMutzke.de — Official website

2012 albums
Max Mutzke albums